Capital is a central concept in Marxian critique of political economy, and in Marxian thought more generally.

Marxists view capital as a social relation reproduced by the continuous expenditure of wage labour. Labour and capital are viewed as historically specific forms of social relations.

Marx stated that "Capital is dead labour, that, vampire-like, only lives by sucking living labour, and lives the more, the more labour it sucks."

See also 
 Property is theft!
 Private property#Criticism

Forms of capital in Marxism:

Monopoly Capital
Key figures:
 Robert Kurz
 Moishe Postone
 Roman Rozdolsky

References

Bibliography

Further reading 

 

Marxian critique of political economy
Marxism
Capital (economics)